Acheikh Ibn-Oumar (born 1951) is a Chadian politician and military leader. In the 1980s he led the Democratic Revolutionary Council (in French CDR: Conseil Démocratique Révolutionnaire), a military-political group opposing the government of President Hissène Habré.
He studied mathematics in France, and then, in the late 70's, joined the historical Chadian revolutionary mouvement FROLINAT (Chad National Liberation Front; in French : "FRont de LIbération NATionale du Tchad).
He held several cabinet positions within the GUNT (Chad National Union Government; in French, "Gouvernement d'Union Nationale du Tchad"), led by Goukouni Weddeye (or Oueddei).
In November 1984, Acheikh Ibn-Oumar was arrested in Tripoli and then transferred to Tibesti where he remained in detention until December 1985, because of serious divergences with both late Colonel Gaddafi and Goukouni.
After a short-lived reconciliation with Goukouni, in 1986, Acheikh Ibn-Oumar and the CDR withdrew support for Goukouni Oueddei, leaving Goukouni isolated. Libya switched support from Goukouni to Ibn-Oumar, backing Ibn-Oumar's forces as they took Ennedi in northern Chad, and sending aircraft and tanks to help Ibn-Oumar defend against a counter-attack by Toubou forces loyal to Goukouni. In mid-November 1986, supported by Libya, Ibn-Oumar became president of a newly constituted GUNT, consisting of seven of the original eleven factions. In 1987 Ibn-Oumar's militia was driven into Darfur by French and Chadian forces, fighting the Fur people there.

In March 1988 Goukouni reestablished control of GUNT, and in June 1988 Oumar was arrested in Tripoli. After negotiations in Iraq, Ibn-Oumar returned to Chad in November 1988, this time heading forces supporting President Habré. Habré made Ibn-Oumar Minister of Foreign Affairs in 1989. As Minister of Foreign Affairs, Ibn-Oumar was the Chadian representative in Algiers for the 31 May 1989 effort at peaceful resolution of the dispute with Libya over the Aozou Strip.

Ibn-Oumar later served in President Déby's government., as Special Adviser (1991-1992), and afterwards as Chad's High Representative to The United Nations, and Ambassador to Washington (1992-1993)

In December 1999, Ibn-Oumar became the leader of a new political grouping, the Comité politique d'action et de liaison (CPAL). In 2006 the CDR joined the UFDD alliance in opposition to President Déby, but Oumar left the UFDD in April 2007, and founded the UFDD-F with Aboud Mackaye.
In 2009, he participated in the latest armed coalition led by president Idriss Déby Itno's own nephew, Timane Erimi, UFR (Resistance Forces Union: in French, "Union des Forces de la Résistance")

References

1951 births
Living people
Chadian politicians
Chadian military leaders